During the 2008–09 German football season, 1. FC Kaiserslautern competed in the 2. Bundesliga.

Season summary
Although Kaiserslautern's form improved, 7th place was still too far away from promotion for the board's liking, and manager Milan Šašić departed in early May, days after a 1–5 defeat to Hansa Rostock. 1. FC Kaiserslautern II manager Alois Schwartz acted as caretaker for the remainder of the season. Marco Kurz was hired as his permanent replacement.

Kit
The kit was manufactured by Italian company Kapppa and sponsored by Frankfurt-based financial advisors Deutsche Vermögensberatung.

Players

First-team squad
Squad at end of season

Left club during season

Competitions

2. Bundesliga

League table

References

Notes

1. FC Kaiserslautern seasons
German football clubs 2008–09 season